Klarup is a town in Denmark. Klarup has a population of 4,969 (1 January 2022).

Notable people 
 Sisse Marie (born 1985 in Klarup) a Danish singer, model, TV hostess and songwriter 
 Frederik Børsting (born 1995 in Klarup) a Danish football player who plays for AaB

References
 

Cities and towns in the North Jutland Region
Towns and settlements in Aalborg Municipality